The Caraquet River is a river in north-eastern New Brunswick, Canada which empties into the Caraquet Bay north of Caraquet.

The river's name means "meeting of two rivers" in the Mi'kmaq language.

River Communities
Bertrand
Burnsville

River Crossings
Route 11
Route 135
Route 340

See also
List of rivers of New Brunswick

References

Rivers of New Brunswick